Urban Rowhouse is the name of several properties:

 Urban Rowhouse (30–38 Pearl Street, Cambridge, Massachusetts)
 Urban Rowhouse (40–48 Pearl Street, Cambridge, Massachusetts)
 Urban Rowhouse (26–32 River Street, Cambridge, Massachusetts)